Satun United Football Club (Thai: สโมสรฟุตบอลสตูล ยูไนเต็ด) is a Thai semi-professional football club based in Satun Province, a city located near to the border of Malaysia. The club is currently playing in the Thai League 3 Southern region.

History
Satun football team was known as one of the most successful provincial team in the past. The team won Yamaha Thailand Cup consecutively in year 1991 and 1992, which was underestimated by football guru, media, and publics at that time. The championship came into reality just like a magic, and that was the story behind naming Satun Football Team as The Ultimate Exorcists. This catchword had been widespread by media and fans till it became a nickname of the team. Although, a style of Satun football team was very much alike to Brazilian football style but it did not make its way to convince media to report in that way.

Crest history

Honours

Domestic leagues
 Thai League 4 Southern Region
 Winners (3): 2017, 2018, 2019
Regional League South Division
 Winners (1): 2015
 Runners-up (2): 2009, 2014

Stadium and locations

Seasons

Players

Current squad

References

External links 
 Official Website
 Official Facebookpage

Association football clubs established in 1998
Football clubs in Thailand
Satun province
1998 establishments in Thailand